The Canon EOS 350D (Canon EOS Digital Rebel XT in North America and the Canon EOS Kiss Digital N in Japan) is an 8.0-megapixel entry-level digital single-lens reflex camera manufactured by Canon. The model was initially announced in February 2005. Part of the EOS range, it is the successor to the EOS 300D and the predecessor to the EOS 400D (or Digital Rebel XTi), which was released in August 2006.

Details
The 350D is the successor to the Canon EOS 300D, which was the first sub-US$1000 digital SLR, introduced in 2003. There are some differences between the 350D and the 300D. Many of the features 'locked out' by Canon in the 300D were unlocked in this camera, so it has been subject to less unofficial 'hacking' to release the locked features. In addition to these unlocked features, a number of other improvements have been made. Some of the most significant upgrades include:
 8.0 megapixels (up from 6.3)
 DIGIC II image processor
 Faster power on times (0.2 seconds)
 Compact Flash type II capability (includes microdrives)
 14 (JPEG) or 4 (raw) frames continuous shooting buffer
 Smaller and lighter body
 Increased function customization
 E-TTL II flash algorithm (improvement over the old E-TTL flash algorithm)
 Mirror lock-up
 Selectable AF and metering modes
 USB 2.0 interface (improved from the slower USB 1.1 interface on the 300D)
 Lithium ion battery.

The Canon EOS 350D comes with Digital Photo Professional to be able to create JPEG or TIFF files from raw files. This was only available on Canon's professional cameras.

Issues 

Canon had compatibility problems with the Lexar Professional 80x-speed Compact Flash (CF) cards which resulted in either total image loss, or the camera freezing up. In the cases of the camera freezing, the images may still be retrieved using an external CF card reader.

The camera will interpret the presence of a hot shoe protector as the presence of an auxiliary flash attachment thereby disabling the built-in pop-up flash. Removing the hot shoe protector will re-enable the built-in flash. A micro-switch in the hot-shoe senses the presence of the flash.

When using third party lenses, most notably older Sigma lenses, there may be a compatibility issue. Reports exist of people receiving "Err99" errors when using such lenses. The problem is more pronounced when using older lens that do not feature an HSM focus drive. Using the problematic lens with its largest aperture is sometimes possible. Another cause of Err99 messages involve EF-S 18–55 lenses (kit lens for the 350D and 20D) that are defective; purchasing used EF-S 18–55 lenses is a risk factor, especially from eBay auctions. Some auction listings state that the lens was never used – especially those claiming that the lens was originally part of an EOS 400D kit; the best way is to verify the serial numbers indicating the manufacture date.

Firmware updates 
The latest firmware released by Canon for the EOS 350D is version 1.0.3 (released 27 October 2005). It fixes problems relating to remote release cables, as well as a problem while reviewing saved images.

See also 
 Canon EF lens mount
 Canon EF-S lens mount

References

External links 

 Canon EOS system infopage

350D
Cameras introduced in 2005